Mani is a village in India, between Mangalore and Bangalore along the NH-75. The terrain is hilly with paddy fields and arecanut plantations in between. Maani is the bifurcation point of NH-275.

External links
 Mani village PHC

Villages in Dakshina Kannada district